Little Buffalo Creek is a  long 2nd order tributary to the Deep River in Lee County, North Carolina.

Course
Little Buffalo Creek rises in Sanford, North Carolina and then flows north to the Deep River about 2 miles east-northeast of Farmville, North Carolina.

Watershed
Little Buffalo Creek drains  of area, receives about 47.6 in/year of precipitation, and has a wetness index of 458.86 and is about 35% forested.

References

Rivers of North Carolina
Rivers of Lee County, North Carolina